Aloísio Leo Arlindo Lorscheider, O.F.M. (8 October 1924 – 23 December 2007) was a prominent cardinal of the Catholic Church in Brazil during the 1970s and 1980s.  He was renowned as an advocate of liberation theology in the 1970s and was seen by some observers as a serious candidate for the papacy in the two conclaves of 1978.

Early life and ordination
Lorscheider was of German descent, born in Estrela, Rio Grande do Sul, Brazil.  He entered the local Franciscan minor seminary of Taquari at the age of nine years.  He began his novitiate in December 1942 and was ordained as a priest on 22 August 1948.

Professor and bishop
He taught a number of subjects – German, mathematics, Latin – but it was not long before he went to Rome to study dogmatic theology.  Lorscheider received his doctorate in 1952, and returned to Brazil to teach that same subject at the Franciscan Seminary of Divinopolis.

In 1958 Lorscheider was called back to Rome to teach, and in 1962 made bishop of Santo Ângelo.  Lorscheider attended the Second Vatican Council between 1962 and 1965, and he was named Archbishop of Fortaleza in the northeastern state of Ceará in 1973.

Cardinal

As Lorscheider grew in popularity with his flock and his ability as a prelate was recognised, Pope Paul VI gave him a cardinal's hat in May 1976, becoming Cardinal-Priest of S. Pietro in Montorio.  Although at the time he was the fourth-youngest cardinal in the college, Lorscheider already doubted his own health. However, some oddsmakers with Ladbrokes (who had him at odds of 33 to 1) considered him a serious papabile in the August 1978 conclave.

Lorscheider headed the National Conference of Brazilian Bishops from 1971 to 1978. He led the Latin American Episcopal Conference in 1976.

In 1995, Pope John Paul II named Lorscheider Archbishop of Aparecida in São Paulo State. He resigned the pastoral government of the Aparecida archdiocese at the beginning of 2004.

It is also thought Lorscheider was one of the most vital supporters of Albino Luciani's rise to the papacy, and also of Karol Wojtyła's in the October 1978 conclave.

After the death of John Paul II in 2005, Lorscheider said that the European cardinals' "sense of superiority" would not allow them to elect a non-European pope. In poor health and ineligible to vote because he was over the age of 80, he did not attend the pre-conclave discussions at the 2005 conclave that elected Joseph Ratzinger to succeed John Paul II.

Death
He died on 23 December 2007 in Porto Alegre, Brazil after a long hospitalization.

Liberation theology
He defended Leonardo Boff when that theologian was brought to heel by Joseph Ratzinger in the 1980s, and continued his strong social activism, being jailed briefly in 1993 as a result of participating in a protest against government policy.

With the crackdown on dissent in the John Paul II papacy, especially after Cardinal Ratzinger (later Pope Benedict XVI) became prefect of the Congregation for the Doctrine of the Faith in 1981, Lorscheider found himself opposing brother cardinals whom he had been very firmly associated with during the papacy of Pope Paul VI.

During his Church career, he developed his outspoken stance on the appalling poverty that blighted the region. He believed that the Church was obliged to take a firm stand against this poverty and his hard-working and personable character allowed him to develop links with the poor that he observed to be lacking in previous generations of priests. He was a vehement critic of Brazil's military dictatorship and its torture of political opponents and favoured a flexible approach to church structure.

References

External links
 Biography
 
 Obituary in The Times, January 14, 2008

1924 births
2007 deaths
Brazilian cardinals
Participants in the Second Vatican Council
Brazilian people of German descent
Brazilian Friars Minor
Franciscan cardinals
People from Rio Grande do Sul
Cardinals created by Pope Paul VI
20th-century Roman Catholic archbishops in Brazil
Liberation theologians
Roman Catholic archbishops of Aparecida
Roman Catholic archbishops of Fortaleza
Roman Catholic bishops of Santo Ângelo
Brazilian expatriates in Italy